The 1975–76 season was the third season of the Takht Jamshid Cup of Iranian football. The competition was won by Persepolis Football Club of Tehran.

Results

Top goalscorers

References 
Pars sport

Takht Jamshid Cup
Iran
1975–76 in Iranian football